Laércio Soldá (born 22 March 1993), sometimes known simply as Laércio, is a Brazilian footballer who plays as a central defender for Sukhothai in the Thai League.

Club career

Lajeadense
Born in Marau, Rio Grande do Sul, Laércio Soldá represented Gaúcho, Passo Fundo, Ypiranga-RS and Lajeadense as a youth. In January 2012, he moved abroad and joined Swedish side Helsingborgs IF on loan.

Laércio Soldá was promoted to Lajeadense's first team for the 2013 season, and made his senior debut on 17 February of that year by starting and scoring the opener in a 3–0 Campeonato Gaúcho home win against Santa Cruz-RS. He began to appear regularly during the Série D, but spent the first half of the 2014 campaign sidelined due to an injury.

A starter in 2015, Laércio Soldá spent the entire 2016 season out nursing a knee injury.

Caxias
On 12 December 2016, Laércio Soldá was presented at Caxias. The following 15 July, he was loaned to Boa Esporte in the Série B until the end of the year, but featured rarely for the side.

Upon returning, Laércio Soldá was initially a backup option until the 2020 season, where he established himself as a first-choice as his side finished second in the Gauchão. He was also named the Man of the Match in the Final against Grêmio.

On 8 September 2020, Laércio Soldá terminated his contract with Caxias.

Santos
In September 2020, shortly after leaving Caxias, Laércio Soldá started training with Santos, but was unable to sign a contract due to the club's transfer ban. On 9 October, once the ban was lifted, he signed a contract with the club until December 2021.

Laércio Soldá made his Peixe – and Série A – debut on 11 October 2020, replacing Felipe Jonatan in a 2–1 home win against Grêmio. He scored his first goal for the club on 16 December, netting his side's fourth in a 4–1 Copa Libertadores home routing of the same opponent; it was also his debut in the competition.

Chapecoense
On 1 April 2021, Laércio Soldá signed a contract with fellow first division side Chapecoense until December 2022.

Career statistics

Honours
Lajeadense
Copa FGF: 2014, 2015

References

External links

Santos FC profile 

1993 births
Living people
Sportspeople from Rio Grande do Sul
Brazilian footballers
Association football defenders
Campeonato Brasileiro Série A players
Campeonato Brasileiro Série B players
Campeonato Brasileiro Série D players
Clube Esportivo Lajeadense players
Sociedade Esportiva e Recreativa Caxias do Sul players
Boa Esporte Clube players
Santos FC players
Associação Chapecoense de Futebol players
Brazilian expatriate footballers
Brazilian expatriate sportspeople in Sweden
Expatriate footballers in Sweden
Laercio Solda
Laercio Solda
Expatriate footballers in Thailand